The 17th Air Division is an inactive United States Air Force unit. Its last assignment was with Pacific Air Forces, stationed at U-Tapao Royal Thai Navy Airfield, Thailand, where it was inactivated on 1 January 1976.

History
The air division was first activated as the 17th Bombardment Wing on 18 December 1940, and assigned to the Southeast Air District.  It was assigned the 3d and 27th Bombardment Groups as its operational units, and the 22d Pursuit Wing was attached from January to June 1942.  In September 1941, the wing was inactivated and its personnel used to form the 3d Air Support Command.

Reactivated as part of Second Air Force in June 1942 as the 17th Bombardment Training Wing.   Was the primary training command organization for USAAF heavy bombardment (B-17 Flying Fortress, B-24 Liberator) heavy groups during World War II from June 1942 until May 1944.  Initially, it controlled the third phase of training, in which each bombardment group split into tactical components and operated from squadron sized airfields under simulated combat conditions. Later, the 17th supervised the first and second phases of heavy bombardment group and crew training.

In 1943 assumed mission for training B-29 Superfortress Very Heavy bombardment groups prior to their deployment to Twentieth Air Force in the Pacific Theater until April 1946 when it ceased all activity.  It also exercised limited supervision over the training of the XXI and XXII Bomber Commands during 1944.

Strategic Air Command
The disbanded wing was reconstituted and redesignated as the 17th Air Division, and activated on 15 July 1959. It gained control of the 340th and the 305th Bombardment Wings at Bunker Hill AFB, Indiana, and the 4040th Air Base Squadron at Richard I. Bong AFB, Wisconsin in 1959. The two bombardment wings flew normal SAC alert patrols and participated in special exercises as required. The division lost its bombardment wings and gained missile wings in 1963, assuming responsibility for Titan and Minuteman missiles in Missouri, Kansas, and later Arkansas. When joined by the 70th Bombardment Wing, on 1 July 1965 with B-52 and KC-135 aircraft, the division reverted to an earlier designation – 17th Strategic Aerospace Division. From 1965 to 1971, the division's units frequently deployed bomber and tanker resources. Arc Light operations in Southeast Asia, consisting of military operations against enemy forces in Vietnam, drew most of the deployments.

Pacific Air Forces
From 1 July 1975 to 1 January 1976 as part of Pacific Air Forces, it maintained an effective training program for United States Air Force tactical units in Thailand.   Inactivated as part of the USAF phaseout of activities in Thailand after the end of the Vietnam War.

Lineage
 Constituted as the 17th Bombardment Wing on 3 October 1940
 Activated on 18 December 1940
 Inactivated on 1 September 1941
 Activated on 23 June 1942
 Redesignated 17th Bombardment Training Wing in January 1943
 Redesignated 17th Bombardment Operational Training Wing in April 1943
 Inactivated on 15 November 1943
 Redesignated 17th Bombardment Operational Training Wing (Very Heavy)
 Activated on 11 March 1944
 Inactivated on 9 April 1946
 Disbanded on 8 October 1948
 Reconstituted and redesignated 17th Air Division, on 1 July 1959
 Activated on 15 July 1959
 Redesignated as: 17th Strategic Aerospace Division on 15 February 1962
 Redesignated as: 17th Strategic Missile Division on 1 September 1963
 Redesignated as: 17th Strategic Aerospace Division on 1 July 1965
 Inactivated on 30 June 1971
 Redesignated as: 17th Air Division on 24 January 1975
 Activated on 1 July 1975
 Inactivated on 1 January 1976

Assignments

 GHQ Air Force, 18 December 1940
 Southeast Air District (later, Third Air Force), 16 January 1941 – 1 September 1941
 Attached to III Bomber Command, 23 April – 1 September 1941
 Second Air Force, 23 June 1942
 II Bomber Command, 15 May 1943
 Second Air Force, 6 October – 15 November 1943; 11 March 1944
 Fifteenth Air Force, 31 March – 9 April 1946
 Second Air Force, 15 July 1959
 Eighth Air Force, 1 July 1963
 Fifteenth Air Force, 31 March 1970 – 30 June 1971
 Pacific Air Forces, 1 July 1975 – 1 January 1976

Components

Commands
 XXI Bomber Command: attached c. 15 April – 20 October 1944
 XXII Bomber Command: attached 14 August 1944 – 13 February 1945

Wings

 13th Bombardment Wing: attached 17 August – 17 October 1945
 20th Bombardment Wing: attached c. 15 August 1945 – January 1946
 22d Pursuit Wing: attached 16 January – c. 16 June 1941
 41st Bombardment Wing: attached 17 March – 4 July 1943
 47th Bombardment Wing: attached c. 15 August 1945 – January 1946
 70th Bombardment Wing: 1 July 1965 – 31 December 1969
 72d Bombardment Operational Training Wing: attached 20 August – c. 6 October 1943
 73d Bombardment Wing: attached c. 15 April – 17 July 1944
 96th Bombardment Wing: attached 16 August – 17 October 1945
 305th Bombardment Wing: 15 July 1959 – 1 January 1961
 308th Strategic Missile Wing: 31 March 1970 – 30 June 1971
 313th Bombardment Wing: attached 23 April – 5 November 1944
 314th Bombardment Wing: attached 23 April – 9 December 1944
 315th Bombardment Wing: attached 17 July 1944 – June 1945
 316th Bombardment Wing: attached 14 August 1944 – 7 July 1945
 340th Bombardment Wing: 15 July 1959 – 1 September 1963
 351st Strategic Missile Wing: 1 February 1963 – 30 June 1971
 381st Strategic Missile Wing: 1 July 1963 – 30 June 1971
 500th Air Refueling Wing: 1 January – 1 July 1963
 4045th Air Refueling Wing: 9 September 1960 – 1 January 1963
 432lst Strategic Wing: 1 October 1959 – 15 August 1962

Groups

 2d Bombardment Group: attached 2 November 1942 13 March 1943
 3d Bombardment Group: 18 December 1940 – 1 September 1941
 6th Bombardment Group: attached 5 May – 18 November 1944
 9th Bombardment Group: attached 5 May – 18 November 1944
 16th Bombardment Group: attached 5 May 1944 – June 1945
 19th Bombardment Group: attached c. 15 April – 7 December 1944
 27th Bombardment Group: 18 December 1940 – 1 September 1941
 29th Bombardment Group: attached c. 15 April – 7 December 1944
 34th Bombardment Group: attached 2 November – 14 December 1942
 39th Bombardment Group: attached c. 15 April 1944 – 8 January 1945
 44th Bombardment Group: attached 24 July 1945 – 30 March 1946
 45th Bombardment Group: attached 15 January – 17 June 1941
 46th Bombardment Group: attached 15 January – 19 May 1941
 48th Bombardment Group: attached 15 January – 21 May 1941
 56th Pursuit Group: attached 15 January – 16 May 1941
 88th Bombardment Group: attached c. 1 November 1942 – November 1943
 91st Bombardment Group: attached c. 26 June – 24 August 1942
 93d Bombardment Group: attached 24 July 1945 – 30 March 1946
 95th Bombardment Group: attached 2 November 1942 – 18 April 1943
 96th Bombardment Group: attached 28 September – 30 October 1942
 98th Bombardment Group: attached c. 6 May – 10 November 1945
 99th Bombardment Group: attached 2 – c. 16 November 1942
 100th Bombardment Group: attached 2 – c. 29 November 1942
 302d Bombardment Group: attached 1–30 September 1942
 303d Bombardment Group: attached 1 – c. 23 August 1942
 304th Bombardment Group: attached 2 November – c. December 1942
 305th Bombardment Group: attached 1–31 August 1942
 306th Bombardment Group: attached 1 July – 1 August 1942
 307th Bombardment Group: attached 30 September – 20 October 1942
 330th Bombardment Group: c. 15 April 1944 – 7 January 1945
 331st Bombardment Group: attached 12 July 1944 – July 1945
 333d Bombardment Group: attached 1 September – 1 November 1942; 7 July 1944 – August 1945
 346th Bombardment Group: attached 18 August 1944 – September 1945
 351st Bombardment Group: attached November – December 1942
 376th Bombardment Group: attached 8 May – 10 November 1945
 379th Bombardment Group: attached 3 – c. 18 November 1942
 381st Bombardment Group: attached c. 1 December 1942 – c. 2 January 1943
 382d Bombardment Group: attached 25 August 1944 – September 1945
 383d Bombardment Group: attached 12 November 1942 – c. 25 October 1943; 28 August 1944 – September 1945
 385th Bombardment Group: attached 1 February – June 1943
 390th Bombardment Group: attached 26 January – 4 July 1943
 393d Bombardment Group: attached 16 February – c. 2 March 1943
 395th Bombardment Group: attached 16 February – c. 24 October 1943
 396th Bombardment Group: attached 10 April – c. 4 November 1943
 398th Bombardment Group: attached 1 March – c. 4 April 1943; 29 April – November 1943
 401st Bombardment Group: attached 1 April – 1 October 1943
 447th Bombardment Group: attached 1 May – November 1943
 448th Bombardment Group: attached 11 September – November 1943; 25 July 1945 – c. 30 March 1946
 449th Bombardment Group: attached 24 July 1945 – c. 30 March 1946
 450th Bombardment Group: attached c. 26 July – 15 October 1945
 452d Bombardment Group: attached 1 June – November 1943
 456th Bombardment Group: attached 17 August – 17 October 1945
 457th Bombardment Group: attached 1 July – November 1943
 458th Bombardment Group: 25 July – c. 20 August 1945
 463d Bombardment Group: attached 1 August – c. 4 November 1943
 466th Bombardment Group: attached 25 July – c. 14 August 1945
 467th Bombardment Group: attached 25 July 1945 – c. 30 March 1946
 483d Bombardment Group: attached 20 September – c. 5 November 1943
 484th Bombardment Group: attached 20 September – November 1943
 485th Bombardment Group: attached 24 July 1945 – 30 March 1946
 488th Bombardment Group: attached 1 October – c. 31 October 1943
 489th Bombardment Group: attached c. 28 February – c. 2 April 1945; c. 10 July – September 1945
 497th Bombardment Group: attached c. 15 April – 18 July 1944
 498th Bombardment Group: attached c. 15 April – 13 July 1944
 499th Bombardment Group: attached c. 15 April – 22 July 1944
 500th Bombardment Group: attached 16 April – 23 July 1944
 501st Bombardment Group: attached 1 June 1944 – June 1945
 502d Bombardment Group: attached 5 June 1944 – July 1945
 504th Bombardment Group: attached c. 15 April – 5 November 1944
 505th Bombardment Group: attached c. 15 April – 6 November 1944.

Stations

 Hunter Army Air Field, Georgia, 18 December 1940 – 1 September 1941
 Rapid City Army Air Base, South Dakota, 23 June 1942
 Walla Walla Army Air Field, Washington, c. 1 July – 15 November 1943
 Smoky Hill Army Air Field, Kansas, 11 March 1944
 Colorado Springs Army Air Base, Colorado, April 1944
 Grand Island Army Air Field, Nebraska, May 1944
 Sioux City Army Air Base, Iowa, February 1945
 Fort Worth Army Air Field, Texas, December 1945 – 9 April 1946.
 Whiteman Air Force Base, Missouri, 15 July 1959 – 30 June 1971
 U-Tapao Royal Thai Navy Airfield, Thailand, 1 July 1975 – 1 January 1976

See also
 List of United States Air Force air divisions

References

Notes

Bibliography

  
 
 

Military units and formations established in 1959
Units and formations of Strategic Air Command
017